Zinc transporter SLC39A7 (ZIP7), also known as solute carrier family 39 member 7, is a protein that in humans is encoded by the SLC39A7 gene. Its fruit fly orthologue is Catsup.

Function 

Zinc is an essential cofactor for more than 50 classes of enzymes. It is involved in protein, nucleic acid, carbohydrate, and lipid metabolism, as well as in the control of gene transcription, growth, development, and differentiation. Zinc cannot passively diffuse across cell membranes and requires specific transporters, such as SLC39A7, to enter the cytosol from both the extracellular environment and from intracellular storage compartments.

ZIP7 is a membrane transport protein of the endoplasmic reticulum. Phosphorylation of ZIP7 by casein kinase 2 stimulates the release of zinc ions from the endoplasmic reticulum This provides a signal transduction pathway by which activation of cell surface receptors such as the epidermal growth factor receptor can regulate the activity of downstream phosphatases and kinases.

See also
 Solute carrier family

References

Further reading

Solute carrier family